Henry Augustus Simmons (21 February 1911 – 23 March 1944) was an English high jumper. He competed at the 1928 Summer Olympics and finished in 11th place. The same year he set a British junior record at 1.86 m. Simmons was a Royal Air Force officer and won the RAF high jump title in 1930, 1932 and 1935. He died in a training accident during World War II.

Personal life
Simmons served as a wing commander in the Royal Air Force Volunteer Reserve during the Second World War. On 23 March 1944, Simmons died piloting Vickers Wellington LP258, which stalled and crashed near Hardwick, Northamptonshire. Simmons and five other crew members were killed. He is buried at Oxford (Botley) Cemetery.

References

1911 births
1944 deaths
Olympic athletes of Great Britain
Athletes (track and field) at the 1928 Summer Olympics
English male high jumpers
Sportspeople from Southampton
Royal Air Force personnel killed in World War II
Royal Air Force pilots of World War II
Royal Air Force wing commanders
British World War II bomber pilots
Aviators killed in aviation accidents or incidents in England
Victims of aviation accidents or incidents in 1944
Royal Air Force Volunteer Reserve personnel of World War II